Dennstaedtia bipinnata common names the cuplet fern, cuplet hay-scented fern is a species of fern in the family Dennstaedtiaceae.

Distribution
This species is indigenous to the West Indies and Central America and South America. It is also found in Bolivia, Mexico, Florida, and Puerto Rico.

Habitat
Dennstaedtia bipinnata lives in moist to wet, acidic soils in forested areas.

References

bipinnata
Ferns of the Americas
Ferns of Brazil
Ferns of Mexico
Ferns of the United States
Flora of Central America
Flora of the Caribbean
Flora of South America
Flora of Bolivia
Flora of Florida
Flora of Puerto Rico
Least concern flora of the United States
Least concern biota of North America
Taxa named by Antonio José Cavanilles
Plants described in 1802